Mona Simion is a philosopher. She is professor of philosophy at the University of Glasgow where she is also deputy director of the COGITO Epistemology Research Centre. Simion's work focuses on issues in epistemology, ethics, the philosophy of language, and feminist philosophy.

Biography 

Simion previously held positions at the University of Oslo's ConceptLab and at Cardiff University. She was promoted to professor four years after receiving her PhD in 2016.

Simion is a member of the executive committee of the Aristotelian Society, the management committee of BSTK – The British Society for the Theory of Knowledge, and the steering committee of the Social Epistemology Network. She is on the editorial board of The Philosophical Quarterly and the Asian Journal of Philosophy.

She is principal investigator of a long-term grant funded by the European Research Council entitled ‘KnowledgeLab: Knowledge First Social Epistemology” and Co-Investigator (with Adam Carter, PI and Christoph Kelp) on a Leverhulme Trust-funded project entitled ‘A Virtue Epistemology of Trust’.

Fellowships and awards 
In 2018–2019, she held a Fellowship from the Mind Association for a project entitled ‘Epistemic Norms and Epistemic Functions’, and she won the Young Epistemologist Prize 2021 for her paper ‘Resistance to Evidence and the Duty to Believe’.

Work 

Simion's work focuses on issues in epistemology, ethics, the philosophy of language, and feminist philosophy.

Her book Shifty Speech and Independent Thought: Epistemic Normativity in Context develops a novel account of the normativity of constative speech such as assertion, conjecture, and reporting. In particular, it reconciles two views that have widely been held to be incompatible, to wit, a knowledge-based account of the normativity of constative speech, and a classical invariantist view of the meaning of ‘knows’.

Sharing Knowledge. A Functionalist Account of Assertion (with Christoph Kelp) develops a novel account of the nature and normativity of assertion. It defends the thesis that assertion has the function of generating knowledge in hearers, uses this thesis to provide a rationale for familiar norms of assertion, and explores a range of consequences of this view in epistemology and the philosophy of language.

Books

Reception 
Simion's work is widely cited and discussed, including in several encyclopedia entries. Her work on the normativity of assertion, the nature of justification, and conceptual engineering has been substantively discussed in the literature.

External links 
 Personal Website
 Profile at University of Glasgow
 Profile at PhilPeople 
 Profile at Cogito Epistemology Research Centre
 Profile at Orcid
 Website of KnowledgeLab

References 

Academics of the University of Glasgow
Year of birth missing (living people)
Living people